Sunny Kim (born June 6, 1979) is a South Korean composer and singer whose work is predominantly based in jazz music.

Selected discography

As a leader

2008 - Android Ascension (YDS Music : Korea)

with Prana Trio

2004 - After Dark (Circavision Productions : USA)
2006 - Pranam (Circavision Productions : USA)
2009 - The Singing Image of Fire (Circavision Productions : USA)

with Roswell Rudd Quartet

2008 - Keep Your Heart Right (Sunnyside Records : USA)

with MadLove

2009 - White with Foam (Ipecac Recordings: USA)

with Monocle

2007 - Outer Sunset (Hidden Shore : Australia)

Guest appearances

2006 - Circle (by Seo Young Do Trio)
2006 - Lounge Rap Music Vol. 1 (by Lifted)
2007 - Mozart & Jazz (by JB Trio & Quintet)
2008 - Into a New Groove (by Kyungyoon John Nam)
2010 - The Words Projects 3 Miniatures (by Sam Sadigursky)
2010 - Music for Robots (by Suite Unravelling)
2014 - Let's Face the Music and Dance (duet with Todd Gordon on the album Love dot com)

References

1979 births
Living people
Jazz composers
Place of birth missing (living people)
21st-century South Korean singers
21st-century South Korean women singers
Sunnyside Records artists
Ipecac Recordings artists